Robert Amos (born 11 July 1955) is  a former Australian rules footballer who played with Essendon in the Victorian Football League (VFL).

Notes

External links 		
		
Robert Amos's profile at Australianfootball.com		
		
		
		
		
Living people		
1955 births		
		
Australian rules footballers from Victoria (Australia)		
Essendon Football Club players
Horsham Football Club players